City Channel Dublin was a cable television channel operating in Dublin, Republic of Ireland licensed by the Broadcasting Commission of Ireland for cable and MMDS operation. It had carriage on the formerly NTL owned digital cable system in Dublin. It was the first attempt at a commercial local television network and commercial cable-only channel in the country. City Channel Dublin closed in September 2011 after filing for bankruptcy.

On 16 September 2005 the channel was added to NTL Ireland's electronic programme guide on Channel 107, and programming began on 4 October.

The company was headed by former Radio Telefís Éireann (RTÉ) presenter David Harvey and opened City Channels for Galway and Waterford in early 2006 with about 85% shared content with the rest being local content. Programming from the Dublin channel was shared between the channels.

Twenty people (in addition to presenting staff) were employed in a purpose-built station in Sandyford industrial estate, Dublin.

The channels programming lineup included a Polish language magazine show, partially imported from TVP, called Oto Polska, televised coverage of FM104's Adrian Kennedy Phone Show and a magazine show for the LGBT community called Free To Express.

In August 2011 the company denied rumours that it was to end broadcasting due to financial problems but then closed shortly afterwards.

References

External links
BCI contract award
BCI contract award

Mass media in Dublin (city)
Television stations in Ireland